Aron Gaudet is an American film director, producer, screenwriter, and author. He is best known for The Way We Get By (2009), Beneath the Harvest Sky (2013), and Queenpins (2021). He writes and directs with his wife and film partner, Gita Pullapilly, under their banner, "Team A + G, Inc."

Biography 
Gaudet was born and raised in Old Town, Maine. He was educated at the University of Maine and the New England School of Communications. Prior to working in the film industry, he worked in television news in Bangor, Maine, Burlington, Vermont, Grand Rapids, Michigan, and Boston, Massachusetts. In Boston, he worked for New England Sports Network (NESN) covering the Red Sox and the Bruins. He is a member of the Writers Guild of America and the Directors Guild of America.

Gaudet began his film career in 2007 co-directing an episode titled India: A New Life for the documentary series Frontline/World which aired on June 21, 2007, that year he was selected as a WGBH Filmmaker in Residence for The Way We Get By. In 2009, Gaudet released The Way We Get By, about three senior citizens in Maine who greet American troops returning from Iraq and Afghanistan at the Bangor Airport. His mother, Joan Gaudet, is featured in the film.

In 2012, Gaudet co-created and co-executive produced the national U.S. PBS program Lifecasters, which world premiered at the Film Society of Lincoln Center, he also directed The Gambling Man, a 20-minute documentary short film for the Lifecasters series.

In 2015, Gaudet was awarded the Guggenheim fellowship for his work as a filmmaker and in 2014, he was selected as one of Variety's "10 Directors To Watch" for his narrative feature directorial debut, Beneath the Harvest Sky. During that time, he co-wrote a screenplay for Crook County, a true story of the 1980s FBI investigation in Chicago called Operation Greylord; the screenplay was selected for the 2015 Black List of top unproduced screenplays.

In 2018, Gaudet was selected for the Ryan Murphy Half Initiative for Directing for Television. He shadow directed on the season finale episode of ‘American Horror Story.’

In 2019, Gaudet and Gita Pullapilly created the India-US Film Initiative, a program designed to champion and foster Indian filmmakers in Hollywood and US filmmakers in Bollywood. Gaudet co-wrote the screenplay, Queenpins, with Gita Pullapilly, which they co-directed in 2020. Queenpins is a dark comedy starring Kristen Bell and Vince Vaughn, inspired by the true story of the largest counterfeit coupon caper in history. In 2022, they directed their film, "David Armstrong," that 101 Studios produced with Jeremy Renner.

Filmography

Personal life 
Gaudet is married to Gita Pullapilly, the American screenwriter, film director, and producer. They write and direct under the banner, Team A + G, Inc. production company. In 2022, they published their first book together, Inspiration To Get You Through A F*cked Up Year.

References

External links 

Living people
Year of birth missing (living people)